The Fireflies Are Gone is a 2018 Canadian drama film directed by Sébastien Pilote. It was screened in the Contemporary World Cinema section at the 2018 Toronto International Film Festival, where it won the award for Best Canadian Film.

The film centres on Léo (Karelle Tremblay), a restless teenager in her final year of high school who strikes up a friendship with Steve (Pierre-Luc Brillant), an older man.

In December 2018, the Toronto International Film Festival named the film to its annual year-end Canada's Top Ten list. The film received two Canadian Screen Award nominations at the 7th Canadian Screen Awards in 2019, for Best Overall Sound (Gilles Corbeil and Stéphane Bergeron) and Best Original Score (Philippe Brault).

Cast
 Pierre-Luc Brillant
 Marie-France Marcotte
 François Papineau
 Luc Picard
 Karelle Tremblay

References

External links
 

2018 films
2018 drama films
2010s French-language films
2010s coming-of-age drama films
Canadian coming-of-age drama films
Films directed by Sébastien Pilote
French-language Canadian films
2010s Canadian films